Shaftesbury Act 1851 can refer to:
The Labouring Classes Lodging Houses Act 1851, British legislation
The Common Lodging Houses Act 1851, British legislation